Jammu & Kashmir Ittihadul Muslimeen (Urdu: جموں و کشمیر اتحاد المسلمین) (abbr. JKIM) is a Kashmiri nationalist Shia separatist political party which aims for Shi'a–Sunni unity in Kashmir & independence of Jammu and Kashmir from India through peaceful struggle.  It was founded by Mohammad Abbas Ansari and his followers in 1962 at Srinagar Kashmir.

References 

Political parties